Rising Sun High School may refer to:

Rising Sun High School (Maryland), North East, Maryland
Rising Sun High School (Indiana), Rising Sun, Indiana